The FAW Welsh Cup, currently known as the JD Welsh Cup for sponsorship reasons, is a knock-out football competition contested annually by teams in the Welsh football league system. It is considered the most prestigious of the cup competitions in domestic Welsh association football.

The Football Association of Wales (FAW) is the organising body of this competition, which has been run (except during the two World Wars and the COVID-19 pandemic) every year since its inception in 1877–78.

In the early years of organised football in Wales, football was very much the sport of north Wales rather than the rugby union playing south – the FAW was founded in Wrexham in 1876, and Wrexham remained the site of the FAW's head office until 1986; it was not until 1912 that a southern team, Cardiff City, won the Welsh Cup for the first time.

The winning team qualifies to play in the following season's UEFA Europa Conference League (previously teams qualified for the UEFA Cup Winners' Cup, which was discontinued in 1999, and until 2021, qualified for the UEFA Europa League). Currently, the full sponsored name of the competition is the JD Welsh Cup.

Participants
Until 1995, Welsh clubs playing in the Welsh or English leagues were invited to play in the Welsh Cup. On occasion some English clubs, mostly teams from border areas (for example, Chester City, Crewe Alexandra, Hereford United and Shrewsbury Town), were also invited to participate. However, in the event of an English club winning the Welsh Cup, they were not allowed to progress to the European Cup Winners' Cup. Instead, the best placed Welsh club in the Welsh Cup competition would take the European place.

From 1996 to 2011, only clubs playing in the Welsh football league system were allowed to enter the Welsh Cup. This rule excluded the six Welsh clubs who played in the English football league system: Swansea City, Colwyn Bay, Merthyr Tydfil (replaced by Merthyr Town), Newport County, Cardiff City and Wrexham. On 20 April 2011, the Football Association of Wales invited these six clubs to rejoin the Welsh Cup for the 2011–12 season, but only Merthyr Town, Newport County and Wrexham accepted. In March 2012, UEFA stated that Welsh clubs playing in the English football league system could not qualify for European competitions via the Welsh Cup but they could qualify via the English league and cup competitions, hence they were subsequently again excluded from the Welsh Cup. Colwyn Bay joined the Welsh league system in 2019, thus becoming eligible to compete in the Welsh Cup again.

History
Between the 1961–62 and 1984–85 seasons, the final was played as a two-leg match, originally on a points basis rather than aggregate score. In the 1985–86 season, it reverted back to a one game format (though a replay was required in the first two seasons), then changed to have a single game decided by extra time and penalties as necessary.

Shrewsbury Town hold the record for the most times an English team has won the Cup, a record that will remain unbroken because English teams have not been allowed to compete in the cup since 1995. The last English winner of the Welsh Cup was Hereford United in 1990.

Results

Performance

Performance by club

Notes

See also
FAW Premier Cup
Football in Wales
List of football clubs in Wales
List of stadiums in Wales by capacity
Welsh football league system
Welsh League Cup
FAW Trophy

References

External links

 Welsh Football Data Archive Welsh Cup pages

 
1
Wales
1877 establishments in Wales
Recurring sporting events established in 1877